Two Paths (Spanish:Dos caminos) is a 1954 Spanish drama film directed by Arturo Ruiz Castillo.

Synopsis 
Two friends, combatants on the Republican side, separate at the end of the civil war. Miguel goes into exile in France, and Antonio stays in Spain and works as a doctor in a rural town in the Pyrenees. The return of Miguel, after having been in a concentration camp, as a maquis will allow his reunion.

Cast

References

Bibliography 
 Bentley, Bernard. A Companion to Spanish Cinema. Boydell & Brewer 2008.

External links 
 

1954 drama films
Spanish drama films
1954 films
1950s Spanish-language films
Films directed by Arturo Ruiz Castillo
Spanish black-and-white films
1950s Spanish films